The Smolyani (in Byzantine sources Smolenoi or Smoleanoi) were a medieval Slavic tribe that settled in the Rhodope Mountains, the valley of the Mesta River and the region around Blagoevgrad Province, possibly in the 7th-8th century. The tribe revolted against the Byzantine authorities of Constantinople in 837 and were supported by Bulgarian ruler Presian, who, together with his deputy Kavhan Isbul, crossed the lands of the Smolyani and conquered the territory as far south as Philippi, including most of Macedonia.

The city of Smolyan in southern Bulgaria is named after this  tribe.

See also
List of Medieval Slavic tribes
 Presian Inscription

References
 

Sclaveni
First Bulgarian Empire
Medieval Thrace
Slavic tribes in Macedonia
Slavic tribes in Thrace and Moesia